Ripley is a city in Tippah County, Mississippi, United States. The population was 5,395 at the 2010 census. It is the county seat of Tippah County.

Colonel William Clark Falkner, great-grandfather of authors William Faulkner and John Faulkner, was a prominent resident of Ripley in the mid to late-19th century. W.C. Falkner's exploits in and around Ripley served as the model for Faulkner's character of Colonel John Sartoris.

Ripley is located in the Hills region of North Mississippi, an important region for the birth of American music. The area is known as the birthplace of the hill country blues.

Geography
Ripley is located at  (34.732363, -88.947055).

Demographics

2020 census

As of the 2020 United States Census, there were 5,462 people, 1,735 households, and 1,100 families residing in the city.

2000 census
As of the census of 2000, there were 5,478 people, 2,174 households, and 1,441 families residing in the city. The population density was 476.8 people per square mile (184.1/km). There were 2,334 housing units at an average density of 203.1 per square mile (78.4/km). The racial makeup of the city was 75.65% White, 19.90% African American, 0.22% Native American, 0.20% Asian, 0.02% Pacific Islander, 3.34% from other races, and 0.68% from two or more races. Hispanic or Latino of any race were 4.91% of the population.

There were 2,174 households, out of which 32.0% had children under the age of 18 living with them, 47.0% were married couples living together, 15.2% had a female householder with no husband present, and 33.7% were non-families. 30.5% of all households were made up of individuals, and 14.4% had someone living alone who was 65 years of age or older. The average household size was 2.41 and the average family size was 2.99.

In the city, the population was spread out, with 24.5% under the age of 18, 10.7% from 18 to 24, 26.4% from 25 to 44, 20.4% from 45 to 64, and 18.0% who were 65 years of age or older. The median age was 36 years. For every 100 females, there were 84.9 males. For every 100 females age 18 and over, there were 81.3 males.

The median income for a household in the city was $25,728, and the median income for a family was $31,174. Males had a median income of $26,275 versus $20,160 for females. The per capita income for the city was $12,979. About 18.3% of families and 21.0% of the population were below the poverty line, including 26.7% of those under age 18 and 21.9% of those age 65 or over.

Education
The City of Ripley is served by the South Tippah School District. The Ripley school system includes Ripley Elementary School,  Ripley Middle School and  Ripley High School.

Culture

Historic district

The Ripley Historic District in central Ripley is listed on the National Register of Historic Places.

First Monday Trade Day
Ripley is the home of the First Monday Trade Day held the weekend prior to the first Monday of every month. It is one of the oldest outdoor flea markets in the United States. It started around the turn of the 20th century at the old square but is now held south of Ripley along Highway 15 across from the Tippah County Fair Grounds.  It has seen publicity by various news channels over the years for its tolerance of a controversial live animal market housed at the back edge of the trading grounds.

William Faulkner Festival
There is an annual walking tour of historic William Faulkner sites during Ripley's annual Faulkner Festival in early November.  But it is not celebrated widely throughout Ripley.

Notable people
 Super Bowl winner Jim Miller punted for the San Francisco 49ers when they won Super Bowl XVI
 Super Bowl winner Kendall Simmons was an offensive lineman for the Pittsburgh Steelers when they won Super Bowl XL
 Author John Grisham attended Ripley Elementary School
 Award-winning gospel music artist Carroll Roberson resides in Ripley
 Northeast Mississippi Daily Journal columnist Robert Bruce Smith, IV, author and historical lecturer
 U.S. Representative Thomas Spight
 State Senator Lee Yancey

References

External links
City of Ripley, Mississippi Website

Cities in Mississippi
Cities in Tippah County, Mississippi
County seats in Mississippi